An Pierlé (born An Miel Mia Pierlé on 13 December 1974) is a Belgian pianist and singer-songwriter.

Career
She studied classical piano and enrolled at the age of 17 at the art school  in Antwerp. In her third year there she made a solo programme with songs of her own, alone at the piano. Shortly after she became known to a moderately wide audience in 1996 when she entered Humo's Rock Rally with a tape of her own version of Gary Numan's Are 'Friends' Electric?. The song ended up on a number of albums, including Random, a Numan tribute album.

After this, Pierlé toured for two years with a theatre group, and starred in a Belgium television series, gave a few solo performances and collaborated with DAAU on their song "Broken", where she sings all of the vocals.

Mud Stories
In 1998 she signed a record deal with Warner Music Benelux. This resulted in her first album titled Mud Stories, completely in singer-songwriter fashion. Most of the album was recorded on electric piano in the winter of 1998 and 1999 in the attic of a theatre in Ghent (in some songs, with high quality audio equipment, very faint background car noises can be heard).  The extra acoustic piano parts were done in the spring of 1999.  This resulted in a range of songs with very little production, essentially Pierlé and her piano, plus an occasional accordion.

The record sold over 25,000 copies in Belgium and the Netherlands.

Helium Sunset
In 2002 An Pierlé released her second record, Helium Sunset. Unlike the previous album, this album was also released outside of the Benelux and France. Most of the songs here were co-written by Koen Gisen.

Following the release of Helium Sunset was a live album named Live Jetset with Orchestra, an album with back up from a full orchestra. The album was first released only as the second CD of the Belgian double release. It was later released as a separate disc, including original artwork. This album was apparently very limited in release numbers and sold out pretty quickly.

2005 saw a new release of Helium Sunset, complete with a new cover featuring An Pierlé (unlike the first releases). In France, a 2-disc version of this was released. The second disc contained the cover "Il est 5 heures (Paris)", which was a moderately successful radio hit in France and Belgium, plus a few live tracks recorded during a radio session in the United Kingdom.

White Velvet
Pierlé and band released the album An Pierlé & White Velvet in early May 2006. Pierlé and the band are now also performing under the same name. As of late April 2006, the first single named "How Does It Feel?" was already available for download in online stores, including two studio live covers. After the release, the follow-up single in the Benelux and France was "Jupiter". 8 April 2007, "It's Got to be Me" was released as a digital single, backed with a French version of the song.

Discography
Studio albums
 Mud Stories (1999)
 Helium Sunset (2002)
 Helium Sunset, 2-disc French edition (2005)
 An Pierlé & White Velvet (2006)
 Hinterland (2010)
 Strange Days (2013)
 Le tout nouveau testament (Score – 2015)
 Arches (2016)
 Cluster (2017)

EPs
 Tower (2000)
 Live Jet Set with Orchestra (2002)
 Strange Ways (2013)

Compilations
 Singles & Rarities + Live in Brussels, Paris & Hamburg (2008)

Singles
 "Mud Stories" (1999)
 "Tower" (2000)
 "As Sudden Tears Fall" (2002)
 "Sing Song Sally" (2002)
 "(Il est 5 heures) Paris s'éveille" (2004)
 "How Does It Feel" (2006)
 "It's Got To Be Me" (2007)
 "Such a Shame" (2012)

Film scores
 Eldorado (2008)
 The Brand New Testament (2015)

References

External links

 
 muziekarchief.be

1974 births
Living people
English-language singers from Belgium
People from Deurne, Belgium
Belgian singer-songwriters
PIAS Recordings artists
Pierle, An
21st-century Belgian women singers
21st-century Belgian singers
Magritte Award winners